Erdu Township is a township of Shimen County in Hunan, China. The township is located in the southwestern Shimen County, it is bordered by Xinguan, Chujiang and Yijiadu towns to the north, Linli County to the east, Jiashan Town to the south, Miaoshi Town of Cili County to the west.

History
Tujia people inhabited the land in pre-Ming times, it was a separate regime roled by Tusi in Yuan dynasty. In 1369, the Tusi surrendered to the Ming dynasty. Han immigrant increased after Tusi's surrender, a conflict broke out between Ming government and Tusi in 1390, with his tribe, the Tusi was forced to transfer to the Western Hunan. Erdu Township was formed in 1956, reorganized as a commune, reformed as a township in 1984.

References

Shimen County
Townships of Hunan